Harry Brown may refer to:

Arts and entertainment
Harry Joe Brown (1890–1972), American movie producer and theatre and film director
Harry Brown (writer) (1917–1986), American screenwriter and novelist
Harry Brown (journalist) (1930–2002), Canadian radio and television host

Politics and law
Harry Brown (Australian politician) (1863–1925), member of the WA Legislative Assembly
Harry Brown (public servant) (1878–1967), Australian public servant
Harry Knowlton Brown (1897–1974), politician from Alberta, Canada
Harry Brown (American politician) (born 1955), member of the North Carolina Senate

Sports

Association football (soccer)
Harry Brown (footballer, born 1883) (1883–1934), English inside forward for Bradford Park Avenue, Fulham, Northampton Town, Southampton, Newcastle United and West Bromwich Albion
Harry Brown (footballer, born 1897) (1897–1958), English centre-forward who played for Queens Park Rangers and Sunderland
Harry Brown (footballer, born 1907) (1907–1963), Scottish inside forward who played for Chesterfield, Darlington, Hibernian, Plymouth Argyle and Reading
Harry Brown (footballer, born 1918) (1918–1963), English half-back who played for Hull City and Wolverhampton Wanderers
Harry Brown (footballer, born 1924) (1924–1982), English goalkeeper who played for Derby County, Exeter City, Notts County, Plymouth Argyle and Queens Park Rangers

Other sports
Harry Brown (baseball) (fl. 1910s), American baseball player
Harry Brown (Australian footballer) (1903–?), Australian rules footballer for St Kilda
Harry Brown (basketball) (1948–2021), American-born Canadian basketball player and educator

Others
Harry Gunnison Brown (1880–1975), American economist
Harry Bingham Brown (1883–1954), American pioneer aviator
Harry W. Brown (VC) (1898–1917), Canadian recipient of the Victoria Cross
Harry W. Brown (pilot) (1921–1991), American pilot at Pearl Harbor

Other uses
Harry Brown (film), 2009 film

See also
Harry Browne (1933–2006), American writer and politician
Harry C. Browne (1878–1954), American actor, musician, and singer
Henry Brown (disambiguation)
Harold Brown (disambiguation)
Harrison Brown (disambiguation)